Adam Eustace (born 9 January 1979 in Gloucester, England) is an English rugby union footballer. A former pupil of St Peter's High School in Gloucester, his regular position is as a lock. He re-signed to Gloucester Rugby in the summer of 2008, having been released by the Scarlets. During his first spell at Gloucester he started in the 2003 Powergen Cup Final in which Gloucester defeated Northampton Saints.

Eustace was called up to train with the senior England squad in October 2000 but was ultimately never capped at that level.

References

External links
Gloucester profile
Scarlets profile

1979 births
Living people
English rugby union players
Rugby union locks
Gloucester Rugby players
Scarlets players
Northampton Saints players
Rugby union players from Gloucester
People educated at St Peter's High School, Gloucester